The following outline is provided as an overview and topical guide of France:

France – country in Western Europe  with several overseas regions and territories. Metropolitan France extends from the Mediterranean Sea to the English Channel and the North Sea, and from the Rhine to the Atlantic Ocean.

General reference 

 Common English country name: France
 Official English country name: The French Republic
 Common endonym(s): La France
 Official endonym(s): République française
 Adjectival(s): French (can refer to people, language or anything related to the country)
 Demonym(s): French (or Frenchman/Frenchwoman)
 Etymology: Name of France
 International rankings of France
 ISO country codes: FR, FRA, 250
 ISO region codes: See ISO 3166-2:FR
 Internet country code top-level domain: .fr

Geography of France 

 France is a:
 Country
 Developed country
 Sovereign state
 Member State of the European Union
 Location:
 Northern Hemisphere, on the Prime Meridian
 Eurasia
 Europe
 mostly in Western Europe 
 Time in France
 Time zones:
 Metropolitan France – Central European Time (UTC+01), Central European Summer Time (UTC+02)
 Extreme points of France (major towns)
 North: Dunkirk at the North Sea
 South: Perpignan, at the Spanish border
 East: Haguenau, at the German border
 West: Brest, south of Land's End (England)
 High: Mont Blanc   – highest point of Western Europe
 Low: Les Moëres 
 Land boundaries:  
Metropolitan France:  
 
 
 
 
 
 
 
 
French Guiana: 
 
 
Coastline:  
Metropolitan France: 
Incorporated overseas territories: 
 Population of France: 68,035,000 people (2021 estimate) – 20th most populous country
 Area of France:   – 40th largest country
 Atlas of France
 Communes (municipalities) of France

Environment of France 

 Climate of France
 Ecology of France
 Renewable energy in France
 Geology of France
 National parks of France
 Wildlife of France
 Flora of France
 Flora of the Alps
 Fauna of France
 Birds of France
 Mammals of France
 Non-marine molluscs of France

Geographic features of France 

 Glaciers of France
 Islands of France
 Lakes of France
 Mountains of France
 French Alps
 Volcanoes in France
 Rivers of France
 List of World Heritage Sites in France (See also List of World Heritage Sites in Western Europe for transboundary sites)

Regions of France 
 "Region" is also the name of France's main type of political division

 Metropolitan France (in Western Europe)
 Overseas departments and territories of France

Administrative divisions of France 

 Regions of France
 Departments of France
 Municipalities of France ("Communes")

Regions of France (Administrative) 

Regions of France
Since January 1, 2016, continental France is divided into 13 administrative Regions instead of the former 22 regions. The 5 overseas regions are untouched:

Departments of France 

Departments of France
French departments are roughly analogous to British counties.

Municipalities of France 

 Cities of France
 Capital of France: Paris – also the largest city in France, with over 2,000,000 inhabitants
 Strasbourg – official seat of the European Parliament
 Lyon – silk capital of the world and the location of the headquarters of Interpol and Euronews
 Marseille – France's largest commercial port

Demography of France

Neighbors of France 

Metropolitan France is bordered by:
 Belgium
 Luxembourg
 Germany
 Switzerland
 Italy
 Monaco
 Andorra
 Spain

France is also linked to:
 United Kingdom (by the Channel Tunnel, which passes underneath the English Channel)

France's overseas departments share borders with:
 Brazil (borders French Guiana)
 Suriname (borders French Guiana)
 Sint Maarten (borders Saint-Martin)

Government and politics of France 

 Form of government: unitary semi-presidential republic
 Capital of France: Paris
 Constitutional Council of France
 Elections in France
 French presidential elections:   1848 – 1958 – 1965 – 1969 – 1974 – 1981 – 1988 – 1995 – 2002 – 2007 – 2012 – 2017
 French parliamentary elections:   1795 – 1798 – 1815 – 1816 – 1820 – 1824 – 1827 – 1830 – 1831 – 1834 – 1837 – 1839 – 1842 – 1846 – 1848 – 1849 – 1852 – 1857 – 1863 – 1869 – 1871 (Feb) – 1871 (Jul) – 1876 – 1877 – 1881 – 1885 – 1889 – 1893 – 1898 – 1902 – 1906 – 1910 – 1914 – 1919 – 1924 – 1928 – 1932 – 1936 – 1945 – 1946 (Jun) – 1946 (Nov) – 1951 – 1956 – 1958 – 1962 – 1967 – 1968 – 1973 – 1978 – 1981 – 1986 – 1988 – 1993 – 1997 – 2002 – 2007 – 2012 – 2017
 French referendums:   1793 – 1795 – 1800 – 1802 – 1804 – 1815 – 1851 – 1852 – 1870 – 1945 – 1946 (May) – 1946 (Oct) – 1958 – 1961 – 1962 (Jun) – 1962 (Oct) – 1969 – 1972 – 1988 – 1992 – 2000 – 2005
 Feminism in France
 Foreign relations of France
 Liberalism and radicalism in France
 Political parties in France
 Political scandals of France
 Taxation in France

Branches of the government of France

Executive branch  
Emmanuel Macron, current President of France

 Head of state: President of the French Republic
 Le Gouvernement (Cabinet of ministers)
Head of government: Prime Minister of France
 Minister of Foreign Affairs
 Minister of the Interior
 Minister of Overseas France
 Minister of the Environment
 Minister of Transportation
 Minister of Public Works
 Minister of the Economy, Finance and Industry
 Minister of Defence
 Minister of Justice
 Minister of National Education
 Minister of Higher Education and Research
 Minister of Culture
 Minister of Agriculture
 Minister of Tourism
 Minister of the Sea
 Minister of Health
 Minister of Youth Affairs and Sports
Minister of Budget, Public Accounting and Civil Servants
Minister of Immigration, Integration, National identity and Co-development
 Minister of Social Affairs
 Minister of Housing

Legislative branch 
 Parliament of France (Parlement) (see also: Congress of France)
 French National Assembly (Assemblée Nationale)
 French Senate (Sénat)
 French Economic and Social Council (consultative assembly)

Judicial branch 

 Constitutional Council of France

International relations of France

Foreign relations
 Foreign relations of France
 Foreign policy of François Mitterrand
 France is a nuclear power
 France–Africa relations
 France–Americas relations
 France–Asia relations
Evolution of the French Empire
French colonial empire
French colonisation of the Americas
International relations, 1648–1814 
International relations (1814–1919)
 Aftermath of World War I
International relations (1919–1939)
 Diplomatic History of World War II
 Cold War
 Foreign policy of Charles de Gaulle
 International relations since 1989

International organization membership 
The French Republic is a member of:

African Development Bank Group (AfDB) (nonregional member)
African Union/United Nations Hybrid operation in Darfur (UNAMID)
Arctic Council (observer)
Asian Development Bank (ADB) (nonregional member)
Australia Group
Bank for International Settlements (BIS)
Black Sea Economic Cooperation Zone (BSEC) (observer)
Confederation of European Paper Industries (CEPI)
Conference des Ministres des Finances des Pays de la Zone Franc (FZ)
Council of Europe (CE)
Council of the Baltic Sea States (CBSS) (observer)
Development Bank of Central African States (BDEAC)
Economic and Monetary Union (EMU)
Euro-Atlantic Partnership Council (EAPC)
European Bank for Reconstruction and Development (EBRD)
European Investment Bank (EIB)
European Organization for Nuclear Research (CERN)
European Space Agency (ESA)
European Union (EU)
Food and Agriculture Organization (FAO)
Group of Five (G5)
Group of Seven (G7)
Group of Eight (G8)
Group of Ten (G10)
Group of Twenty Finance Ministers and Central Bank Governors (G20)
Indian Ocean Commission (InOC)
Inter-American Development Bank (IADB)
International Atomic Energy Agency (IAEA)
International Bank for Reconstruction and Development (IBRD)
International Chamber of Commerce (ICC)
International Civil Aviation Organization (ICAO)
International Criminal Court (ICCt)
International Criminal Police Organization (Interpol)
International Development Association (IDA)
International Energy Agency (IEA)
International Federation of Red Cross and Red Crescent Societies (IFRCS)
International Finance Corporation (IFC)
International Fund for Agricultural Development (IFAD)
International Hydrographic Organization (IHO)
International Labour Organization (ILO)
International Maritime Organization (IMO)
International Mobile Satellite Organization (IMSO)
International Monetary Fund (IMF)
International Olympic Committee (IOC)
International Organization for Migration (IOM)
International Organization for Standardization (ISO)
International Red Cross and Red Crescent Movement (ICRM)
International Telecommunication Union (ITU)
International Telecommunications Satellite Organization (ITSO)

International Trade Union Confederation (ITUC)
Inter-Parliamentary Union (IPU)
Multilateral Investment Guarantee Agency (MIGA)
North Atlantic Treaty Organization (NATO)
Nuclear Energy Agency (NEA)
Nuclear Suppliers Group (NSG)
Organisation internationale de la Francophonie (OIF)
Organisation for Economic Co-operation and Development (OECD)
Organization for Security and Cooperation in Europe (OSCE)
Organisation for the Prohibition of Chemical Weapons (OPCW)
Organization of American States (OAS) (observer)
Pacific Islands Forum (PIF) (partner)
Paris Club
Permanent Court of Arbitration (PCA)
Schengen Convention
Secretariat of the Pacific Community (SPC)
Southeast European Cooperative Initiative (SECI) (observer)
Union Latine
United Nations (UN)
United Nations Conference on Trade and Development (UNCTAD)
United Nations Educational, Scientific, and Cultural Organization (UNESCO)
United Nations High Commissioner for Refugees (UNHCR)
United Nations Industrial Development Organization (UNIDO)
United Nations Institute for Training and Research (UNITAR)
United Nations Interim Force in Lebanon (UNIFIL)
United Nations Mission for the Referendum in Western Sahara (MINURSO)
United Nations Mission in Liberia (UNMIL)
United Nations Mission in the Central African Republic and Chad (MINURCAT)
United Nations Observer Mission in Georgia (UNOMIG)
United Nations Operation in Cote d'Ivoire (UNOCI)
United Nations Organization Mission in the Democratic Republic of the Congo (MONUC)
United Nations Relief and Works Agency for Palestine Refugees in the Near East (UNRWA)
United Nations Security Council (permanent member)
United Nations Stabilization Mission in Haiti (MINUSTAH)
United Nations Truce Supervision Organization (UNTSO)
Universal Postal Union (UPU)
West African Development Bank (WADB) (nonregional)
Western European Union (WEU)
World Confederation of Labour (WCL)
World Customs Organization (WCO)
World Federation of Trade Unions (WFTU)
World Health Organization (WHO)
World Intellectual Property Organization (WIPO)
World Meteorological Organization (WMO)
World Organization of the Scout Movement
World Tourism Organization (UNWTO)
World Trade Organization (WTO)
World Veterans Federation
Zangger Committee (ZC)

Law of France 

 Adoption in France
 Cannabis in France
 Capital punishment in France
 Census in France
 Constitution of France
 Crime in France
 Polygamy in France
 Law enforcement in France
 National law enforcement agencies
 National Police ("Police Nationale")
 National Gendarmerie ("Gendarmerie Nationale")
 Mobile Gendarmerie ("Gendarmerie Mobile")
 Local law enforcement agencies
 Police municipale (Municipal police) – may be maintained by local governments (communes), but have very limited law enforcement powers outside of traffic issues and local ordinance enforcement
 Garde champetre or Police Rurale (Rural police) – may be formed by Rural communes, and are responsible for limited local patrol and protecting the environment
 Équipes régionales d’intervention et de sécurité (SWAT teams) – are operated by The Department of Corrections (the prison system or Administration pénitentiaire)
 In Wallis and Futuna, there is a territorial guard as well as royal police.
 Human rights in France
 Abortion in France
 Censorship in France
 Declaration of the Rights of Man and of the Citizen
 Gambling in France
 LGBT rights in France
 Prostitution in France
 Smoking in France

Historical law 
 Napoleonic code

Military of France 

 Command
 Commander-in-chief:
 Ministry of Defence of France
 French Armed Forces
 French Army (Armée de Terre)
 French Foreign Legion
 Ranks in the French Army
 French Navy (Marine Nationale)
 Ranks in the French Navy
 French Air Force (Armée de l'Air)
 National Gendarmerie (Gendarmerie Nationale)
 Military history of France

History of France

General topics 

 Territorial formation of France
 Historical French provinces
 Cultural history of France
 Art history of France
 Literary history of France
 Colonial history of France
 Demographics of France
 Economic history of France
 Historical positions and figures
 Prime Ministers of France
 Constable of France
 Military history of France
 Military history of France during World War II

By period

Culture of France 

 Architecture of France
French Baroque architecture
French Colonial
French Gothic architecture
French Renaissance architecture
French Restoration style
French Romanesque architecture
 Art in France
Museums in France
 Literature of France
 French novelists
 Music of France
 French rock
 Theatre in France
 French playwrights
 Cuisine of France
 Cultural icons of France
 Languages of France
 Media in France
 Cinema of France
 Television in France
 Mythology in France
 National symbols of France
 Coat of arms of France
 Flag of France
 National anthem of France
 People of France
 Ethnic minorities in France
 Armenians in France
 Chinese diaspora in France
 Koreans in France
 Turks in France
 Public holidays in France
 Racism in France
 Scouting and Guiding in France
 World Heritage Sites in France (See also Transboundary sites)

Religion and belief systems in France 
 Belief systems
 Humanism in France
 Irreligion and atheism in France
 Religion in France
 Freedom of religion in France
 Religions in France
 Buddhism in France
 Christianity in France
 Eastern Orthodoxy in France
 Oriental Orthodoxy in France
 Protestantism in France
 Roman Catholicism in France
 Hinduism in France
 Islam in France
 Judaism in France
 Scientology in France
 Sikhism in France

Sports in France 

Sport articles specific to France:
 Fédération Française de Basket-Ball
 Football in France
 France at the Olympics: the modern Olympics were invented in France, in 1894
 Grand Prix de France
 French Open (tennis)
 Open de France
 Pétanque
 Parkour ('urban running')
 Rugby in France:
 Rugby union in France
 Rugby League in France
 Tour de France
 Alps Tour
 France men's national handball team

Economy and infrastructure of France 

France is the most visited country in the world, receiving over 79 million foreign tourists annually (including business visitors, but excluding people staying less than 24 hours in France).

 Economic rank
 Nominal GDP: 6th (sixth)
 GDP (PPP): 8th (eighth)
 Agriculture in France
 Banking in France
 Communications in France
 Newspapers in France
 Radio in France
 Telecommunications in France
 Internet in France
 Television in France
 Companies of France

Currency of France: Euro (see also: Euro topics)
ISO 4217: EUR
 Economic history of France
 Energy in France
 Nuclear power in France
 Renewable energy in France
 Health care in France
 Emergency medical services in France
 Poverty in France
 Tourism in France
 Eiffel Tower
 Transport in France
 Airports in France
 Highway system of France
 Rail transport in France
 Trams in France
 Water supply and sanitation in France

Education in France 

The three stages of the education process in France:
 Primary education (enseignement primaire)
 Secondary education (enseignement secondaire)
 Collèges – cater for the first four years of secondary education from the ages of 11 to 15
 Lycées – provide a three-year course of further secondary education for children between the ages of 15 and 18, during which pupils are prepared for the baccalauréat (commonly referred to as le bac).
 Higher education (enseignement supérieur)
 Colleges and universities in France
 Public universities of France
 Grandes écoles

Health in France 

 Hospitals in France
 Obesity in France

See also

France

List of international rankings
Member state of the European Union
Member state of the Group of Twenty Finance Ministers and Central Bank Governors
Member state of the North Atlantic Treaty Organization
Member state of the United Nations
Outline of Europe
Outline of geography

Notes

References

External links

  Radio France Internationale in English
French government
 Official site of the French Embassy in the United Kingdom
 Official site of the French public service – Contains many links to various administrations and institutions
 Frenchculturenow.com: French society, culture, politics news

Country profiles
 France, from the Encyclopædia Britannica
 France, from the CIA World Factbook
 
 France, from the BBC

Culture
 Cocorico! French culture
 Contemporary French Civilization, journal, University of Illinois.
  Radio France Internationale in English culture pages
  Radio France Internationale in English Visiting France page

 
 
Outlines of countries